Achaetothorax is a genus of flies belonging to the family Lesser Dung flies.

Species
A. abyssinica (Duda, 1923)
A. acrostichalis Papp & Norrbom, 1992
A. completus Norrbom & Papp, 1994
A. concavus Norrbom & Papp, 1994
A. coninckae Norrbom & Papp, 1994
A. crypticus Papp & Norrbom, 1992
A. flavipes Papp & Norrbom, 1992
A. grootaerti Norrbom & Papp, 1994
A. malayensis Papp & Norrbom, 1992
A. medialis Norrbom & Papp, 1994
A. pectinatus Norrbom & Papp, 1994
A. rhinocerotis (Richards, 1939)
A. straeleninus (Richards, 1980)
A. trochanteratus Papp & Norrbom, 1992
A. vojnitsi Papp & Norrbom, 1992
A. whittingtoni Norrbom & Papp, 1994

References

Sphaeroceridae
Diptera of Asia
Diptera of Africa
Sphaeroceroidea genera